Joseph Clay (1769–1811) was a U.S. Representative from Pennsylvania.

Joseph Clay may also refer to:

Joseph Clay Jr. (1764–1811), U.S. federal judge
Joseph Clay (Georgia soldier) (1741–1804), soldier and public official